The 21st New Brunswick Legislative Assembly represented New Brunswick between June 21, 1866, and June 3, 1870.

The assembly sat at the pleasure of the Governor of New Brunswick Arthur Charles Hamilton-Gordon. Charles Hastings Doyle became Lieutenant Governor of New Brunswick in 1867 following Confederation. He was succeeded by Francis Pym Harding in October 1867 and then Lemuel Allan Wilmot in July 1868.

The speaker was selected as John H. Gray. From 1867 to 1870, Bliss Botsford held the position of speaker.

The Confederation Party led by Peter Mitchell formed the government; Mitchell was a member of the province's Legislative Council. Andrew R. Wetmore became leader after Mitchell was named to the Canadian senate.

History

Members 

Notes:

References 
Journal of the House of Assembly of ... New Brunswick for the second session of the twentieth ... and the first session of the twenty first General Assembly (1866)

Terms of the New Brunswick Legislature
1870 disestablishments in New Brunswick
1866 in Canada
1867 in Canada
1868 in Canada
1869 in Canada
1866 establishments in New Brunswick